East Bloomfield Historic District is a national historic district located at East Bloomfield in Ontario County, New York. The district encompasses 49 properties with 90 contributing resources including residential, commercial,  religious, and civic properties in the historic core of East Bloomfield.  The structures are centered on the village green.

It was listed on the National Register of Historic Places in 1989.

References

External links

Historic districts on the National Register of Historic Places in New York (state)
Georgian architecture in New York (state)
Federal architecture in New York (state)
Historic districts in Ontario County, New York
National Register of Historic Places in Ontario County, New York